Cheshmeh Bid may refer to:

Cheshmeh Bid, Lorestan
Cheshmeh Bid, Sistan and Baluchestan
Cheshmeh Bid, South Khorasan
Cheshmeh Bid Cheng Baradeh